Sol Gorss, born Saul Gorss (March 22, 1908 – September 10, 1966) was a prominent American movie and television actor and stunt man. He was active from the 1930s to the mid-1960s, when he died.

Before Gorss became an actor, he worked as a professional football player, a caddy and an assistant golf professional.

Gorss appeared in many films, including Warlock, The Phantom (serial), and Adventures of Superman, among many others. In 1944, he owned a night club.

On September 1, 1944, Gorss married actress Virginia Haralson. He is buried at Mount Sinai Memorial Park Cemetery.

Selected filmography
 Times Square Playboy (1936)
 Bengal Tiger (1936)
 The Three Musketeers (1948)
 Flame of Calcutta (1953)
 The Iron Glove (1954)
 The Silencers (1966) - Pilot (uncredited)
 Batman (1966) - Guard (uncredited)
 Red Tomahawk (1967) - Townsman / Roulette Player

References

External links

Jewish American male actors
1908 births
1966 deaths
Burials at Mount Sinai Memorial Park Cemetery
20th-century American male actors
Place of birth missing
Place of death missing
20th-century American Jews